The Yellow Arm is a 1921 American silent action serial directed by Bertram Millhauser and starring Juanita Hansen, Warner Oland and Marguerite Courtot.

Cast
 Juanita Hansen as Suzanne Valette 
 Warner Oland as Joel Bain 
 Marguerite Courtot as Doris Bain 
 Stephen Carr as Jack Bain 
 William Bailey as Jerry Engleson 
 Tom Keith as Alan Marsh

References

Bibliography
 Hans J. Wollstein. Strangers in Hollywood: the history of Scandinavian actors in American films from 1910 to World War II. Scarecrow Press, 1994.

External links

1921 films
1920s action films
American action films
Films directed by Bertram Millhauser
American silent feature films
Pathé Exchange film serials
American black-and-white films
American silent serial films
1920s English-language films
1920s American films
English-language action films